Għajnsielem Football Club is a football club from the Maltese island of Gozo, in the village of Għajnsielem. They are the oldest-still-active club in Gozo and was founded in 1936. The club has won the Gozo Football League First Division seven times.

Squad

Honours
Gozo Football League
Champions (7): 1969–70, 1970–71, 1971–72, 1972–73, 1973–74, 2004–05, 2015–16
G.F.A. Cup
Winners (6): 1973–74, 1986–87, 2000–01, 2002–03, 2006–07, 2016–17
Independence Cup
Winners (6): 1965–66, 1969–70, 1970–71, 1971–72, 1987–88, 2002–03
Zammit Cup
Winners (1): 1936

References

External links
Official website

 
Football clubs in Malta
Gozitan football clubs
Association football clubs established in 1936
1936 establishments in Malta